Neet or NEET may refer to:

 National Eligibility cum Entrance Test (Undergraduate) (NEET-UG), a medical entrance exam in India
 National Eligibility cum Entrance Test (Postgraduate) (NEET–PG), a medical entrance exam in India
 NEET, an acronym for "not in education, employment, or training"
 Neet (fish), also known as poor man's tropheus
 N.E.E.T. Recordings, a record label
 Neet, a former name of the depilatory product Veet

See also
 Neet Covered Bridge
 Neat (disambiguation)
 NEAT (disambiguation)